21st Century Charter School of Gary is a public K-12 charter school in Gary, Indiana, United States. It is authorized by and accountable to Ball State University.

History 
The 21st Century Charter School of Gary was established in 2005, originally serving grades 7–9. The initial curriculum description said, "Spanish language classes for all students will be offered, and character development will be taught."

In 2012, all 19 seniors graduated and were college-bound.

The original school building had a capacity of 400 students, but by 2013 it had become overcrowded with more than 650 students.  A new two-story $6.5 million building with 50,000 square feet was opened in September 2013 to meet the needs of grades seven through twelve; children in grades kindergarten through six remained in the original building.

In 2015, the school celebrated graduating honor roll students, according to the Times of Muenster, Indiana, which described the school's affiliation with Ivy Tech Community College: 

In 2017, CNN featured a student who was receiving a baccalaureate degree from Purdue University before her high school graduation from 21st Century Charter School.

In July 2020, Ball State University gave a notice of probation to the 21st Century Charter School at Gary, questioning, "...why 21st Century — a school known to tout its early college program, providing students with opportunities to earn career certifications and college credits while in high school — was scoring below state averages in elementary and middle school reading comprehension and math."

During the 2020-21 school year, the school served 934 students in grades K–12. 21st Century Charter School's enrollment had increased by 23% over the five preceding school years.

As of 2022, EdRater published the school's cumulative test scores:

References

External links 
Official website

Schools in Gary, Indiana
Educational institutions established in 2005
Charter schools in Indiana
Public high schools in Indiana
Public middle schools in Indiana
Public elementary schools in Indiana
2005 establishments in Indiana